The 2004 German Grand Prix (officially the Formula 1 Grosser Mobil 1 Preis von Deutschland 2004) was a Formula One motor race held at Hockenheim on 25 July 2004. It was Race 12 of 18 in the 2004 FIA Formula One World Championship.

The 66-lap race was won by local driver Michael Schumacher, driving a Ferrari. Englishman Jenson Button finished second in a BAR-Honda despite a ten-place grid penalty for an engine change in practice, and a loose helmet strap during the race, with Spaniard Fernando Alonso third in a Renault. Kimi Räikkönen of McLaren-Mercedes set the fastest lap of the race but retired on lap 14 after his rear wing gave way at Turn 1, sending his car into the barriers at high speed. The first start was aborted after Olivier Panis indicated a problem with his Toyota. This led to a second formation lap, and the shortening of the race by one lap.

This was the final Grand Prix for Brazilian driver Cristiano da Matta, and the final time Williams used the "Walrus" front wing. Marc Gené was replaced at Williams by Antônio Pizzonia, returning to Formula One after being sacked by Jaguar following the 2003 British Grand Prix. Pizzonia scored his first points by finishing seventh.

Friday drivers
The bottom 6 teams in the 2003 Constructors' Championship were entitled to run a third car in free practice on Friday. These drivers drove on Friday but did not compete in qualifying or the race.

Classification

Qualifying

Race

 Panis started the race from the pitlane.

Championship standings after the race 

Drivers' Championship standings

Constructors' Championship standings

Footnotes

References

External links

German Grand Prix
German Grand Prix
Grand Prix
July 2004 sports events in Europe